Tantalizingly Hot is the sixth album by American recording artist Stephanie Mills, released in 1982 and was produced by James Mtume & Reggie Lucas and Ashford & Simpson. It was her first release, by default, on Casablanca Records. In 1981, oil magnate and industrialist Marvin Davis (1925–2004) and financier Marc Rich (1934–2013) bought Twentieth Century-Fox Film Corporation, which owned her previous label, 20th Century-Fox Records, for a grand total of $703 million.

However, Davis expressed disinterest in buying the record company and thus sold the record label to PolyGram earlier that year. PolyGram, a European conglomerate that was buying up US record labels as fast as they could make deals, immediately shut down the label and had all of its artists' contracts and reissues (including Mills') transferred to their Casablanca imprint, which they had owned since owning 50% of the company in 1977. (PolyGram bought the other 50% in 1980, the same year Mills recorded the LP Sweet Sensation).

Track listing
 "Last Night" 4:27 (written and produced by James Mtume & Reggie Lucas)
 "Still Lovin' You" 4:18 (Dean Gant, Imari Amani) produced by James Mtume & Reggie Lucas
 "Keep Away Girls" 4:52 (written and produced by Nickolas Ashford & Valerie Simpson)
 "You Can't Run From My Love" 4:14 (written and produced by James Mtume & Reggie Lucas)
 "True Love Don't Come Easy" 3:00 (Edward Moore, James Balton) produced by James Mtume & Reggie Lucas
 "'Ole Love" 4:45 (Joey Mills, V. Eaglyn) produced by Stephanie Mills
 "Your Love is Always New" 3:03 (Jim Andron, Mark Winkler) produced by James Mtume & Reggie Lucas
 "I Can't Give Back the Love I Feel For You" 4:53 (Brian Holland, Nickolas Ashford, Valerie Simpson) produced by Nickolas Ashford & Valerie Simpson

"Last Night" was released as a single with the track "Wailin'" 2:46 (Roxanne Seeman, Alan Phillips, Franne Golde)  produced by James Mtume & Reggie Lucas on the B-side.

Charts

References

1981 albums
Stephanie Mills albums
Albums produced by Ashford & Simpson
Casablanca Records albums